The following is an episode guide for Tracey Takes On...

Each episode's sketches are written in bold; those not in bold represent character monologues.

"Cut sketches" are those sketches that were either filmed but ended up on the cutting room floor, or sketches that were written but ultimately ditched before filming.  These cut sketches have been confirmed by a variety of outlets: official web sites, press releases, and/or series scripts.

Series overview

Episodes

Season 1 (1996) 
{| class="wikitable plainrowheaders" style="width: 100%; margin-right: 0;"
|-
! style="background: #A80F11; color: #ffffff;"| No. inseries
! style="background: #A80F11; color: #ffffff;"| No. inseason
! style="background: #A80F11; color: #ffffff;"| Title
! style="background: #A80F11; color: #ffffff;"| Directed by
! style="background: #A80F11; color: #ffffff;"| Written by
! style="background: #A80F11; color: #ffffff;"| Original air date
|-
{{Episode list
 |EpisodeNumber = 1
 |EpisodeNumber2 = 1
 |Title = Romance
 |DirectedBy = Thomas Schlamme
 |WrittenBy = Tracey Ullman, Jerry Belson, Dick Clement, Kim Fuller, Jenji Kohan, Ian La Frenais, Molly Newman, Gail Parent, Tony Sheehan, Allan J. Zipper
 |OriginalAirDate = 
 |ShortSummary = <small>Opening voice-over: Romance... Cupid... arrow... Paris... chocolates... saccharine... sugar rush... sappy... Loveboat... Casablanca... this is a fine romance...</small>

Rayleen talks about her husband Mitch, a little person. Mrs. Noh Nang Ning explains how romance is like doughnuts. Virginia reveals the one great romance of her life. Hope fantasizes about a man in a coffee shop. Chic talks about dating in Los Angeles. Fern visits her husband Harry in the hospital. Chris is determined to go public with her relationship with pro-golfer, Midge Dexter. Harry agrees to retire and move to Florida with Fern. Linda sings "A Fine Romance”. Guests stars: Julie Kavner as Midge, Hugh Laurie as Timmy, Michael Tucker as Harry, Danny Woodburn as Mitch |LineColor = A80F11
}}

|}

Season 2 (1997)

Additional notes: The first season's opening voice-over bed sequence was abandoned for this season. Tracey now opens the show with a story in relation to each episode's subject. Tracey and the show's characters lip sync to her 1983 song "They Don't Know", which now serves as the show's new theme song.

 Season 3 (1998) 

Season 4 (1999)

Character Comedies

Specials (1996–98)
Each season of Tracey Takes On...'' included a one-hour "Best of" special with the exception of season 4.

References

Sources

External links
 
 

Lists of American comedy television series episodes
Tracey Ullman